The Oaths, Land and Sea Forces Act 1817 (57 Geo. III, c. 92) was an Act of the Parliament of the United Kingdom. The Act opened up all ranks in the Army and Navy to Roman Catholics and Dissenters.

Notes

United Kingdom Acts of Parliament 1817
United Kingdom military law
Repealed United Kingdom Acts of Parliament